I Wayan Gde Yudane (born in 1964) is a leading balinese composer of contemporary music. He has produced works for concert performance, theatre, sound installation and for film.  by   Kadek Krishna Adidharma, The Jakarta Post, 20 November 2007</ref.

Yudane learnt to play gamelan from his father who was an architect and gamelan instrument maker. He attended the Performing Arts School (STSI) in Denpasar.

In 2002 he became the 2002 Artist-in-Residence at Victoria University of Wellington in New Zealand.

His work, in particular Entering the Stream, has been performed and acclaimed internationally.

His collaboration with Paul Grabowsky, The Theft of Sita, was performed at the 2001 Next Wave Festival in New York City and toured Europe and the US.*"A Tale Told by Shadows Blends the Old and the New", Next Wave Festival review  by Neil Genzlinger, The New York Times, 19 October 2001 He also collaborated with New Zealand composer Jack Body on a piece Paradise Regained for piano and pemade (Balinese metallophone).

In 2018 he performed at the International Gamelan Festival in Fort Vastenburg in Surakarta, Central Java.

References

 Further reading 

 "Wayan Gde Yudane: a man for all cultures" by Duncan Graham, The Jakarta Post, 27 October 2010

External links[https://www.abc.net.au/radionational/programs/archived/radioeye/the-crossroads-of-denpasar/3540014#transcript Crossroads of Denpasar, ABC Classic FM The Listening Room'', 19 April 2003
Personal website
Wayan Gde Yudane at SOUNZ

Year of birth missing (living people)
Living people
Balinese people
Indonesian Hindus
New Zealand composers
Male composers
New Zealand Hindus
New Zealand people of Indonesian descent
Performers of Hindu music
Gamelan musicians